

Race 
Strade Bianche (both the men's race and the women's race) was originally scheduled for 7 March 2020 but was postponed to 1 August 2020 due to the COVID-19 pandemic.

Route
Starting and finishing in Siena, Italy, Strade Bianche is the second event of the 2020 UCI Women's World Tour.

Teams
Eight UCI Women's WorldTeams and fourteen UCI Women's Continental Teams made up the twenty-two teams that competed in the race. This reduced the starting peloton to 121 riders. Of these riders, only 45 finished, while a further 13 riders finished over the time limit.

UCI Women's WorldTeams

 
 
 
 
 
 
 
 

UCI Women's Continental Teams

Result

References

External links
 

Strade Bianche
Strade Bianche
Strade Bianche
Strade Bianche Women
Strade Bianche Women 2020